Rani Lalithangi is a 1957 Indian Tamil-language historical drama film directed by T. R. Raghunath, starring Sivaji Ganesan and P. Bhanumathi. The film, a remake of the 1935 film Lalithangi, was released on 21 September 1957.

Plot

Cast 
Sivaji Ganesan as Azhagapuri Prince Azhagesan
P. Bhanumathi as Lalithangi
Rajasulochana as Maya
P. S. Veerappa as King Gantheeban
K. A. Thangavelu
Serukalathur Sama
K. Sarangapani
R. Balasubramaniam as Emperor Ampalavanan
S. D. Subbulakshmi as Empress Angaiyarkanni
T. P. Muthulakshmi
M. Saroja
Devika as Lalithangi's friend

Production 
Rani Lalithangi is a remake of the 1935 film Lalithangi. The lead role was initially offered to M. G. Ramachandran, but he declined following creative differences; Sivaji Ganesan was later cast.

Soundtrack 
The music composed by G. Ramanathan and lyrics written by Thanjai N. Ramaiah Dass.

Release 
Rani Lalithangi was released on 21 September 1957, and did not do well commercially.

References

External links 
 

1950s historical drama films
1950s Tamil-language films
1957 films
Films directed by T. R. Raghunath
Indian historical drama films
Films scored by G. Ramanathan
Remakes of Indian films